In telecommunication, bilateral synchronization (or bilateral control) is a synchronization control system between exchanges A and B in which the clock at telephone exchange A controls the data received at exchange B and the clock at exchange B controls the data received at exchange A.  

Bilateral synchronization is usually implemented by deriving the timing from the incoming bitstream.

Source: from Federal Standard 1037C in support of MIL-STD-188

See also 
 Plesiochronous digital hierarchy

Synchronization